Butter mochi is a cake made from coconut milk, glutinous rice flour, and butter and is a popular dessert in Hawaiian cuisine.

Description 
Butter mochi combines textures and flavors of its two main influences, mochi and cake. It features a similar chewy ("Q") texture as mochi, but less pronounced through the addition of traditional cake ingredients such as eggs and butter as well as leavening introduced via baking powder.

Unlike other mochi, Butter mochi is baked rather than steamed, lending it a color and texture comparable to blondies and chess pie.

History 
The exact origins of butter mochi are unknown. As its primary ingredient, glutinous rice flour, is commonly used in Japan, it is potentially influenced by Japanese immigration to Hawaii, making it a part of fusion cuisine.

It can also be considered a descendant of bibingka, a similar cake from Filipino cuisine.

Gallery

See also 

 Chichi dango, another confection based on glutinous rice flour popular in Hawaii.

References 

Hawaiian desserts
Confectionery
Baked goods
Hawaiian fusion cuisine
Japanese-American cuisine
Glutinous rice dishes